Elis is a surname.

Notable people with this surname
 Islwyn Ffowc Elis (1924–2004), one of Wales's most popular Welsh-language writers
 Morrie Elis (d. 1992), American bridge player
 Robert Elis (1812–1875), Welsh language poet, editor and lexicographer
 Dafydd Elis-Thomas (born 1946), Welsh politician, member of the House of Lords and a former leader of Plaid Cymru
 Richard Elis (born 1975), Welsh actor

See also
 Elis (given name)
 Elis (disambiguation)
 Ellis, similar surname and given name